The Waiha, sometimes pronounced Veha, are a Seraiki-speaking Rajput tribe, found in the province of Punjab.

Saraiki tribes
Punjabi tribes